Hayley (pronounced ) is an English given name.

It is derived from the English surname Haley, which in turn was based on an Old English toponym, a compound of heg "hay" and leah "clearing or meadow". 

While it can be used for males, Hayley is most commonly a female given name. This use became popular following the surge to prominence of child actress Hayley Mills (b. 1946), but the name was not used with any frequency prior to the 1980s. Its popularity peaked in the 1980s and early 1990s in the UK and (along with variants such as Haley and Hailey) in the 1990s and 2000s in the US, but since the 2000s has again declined significantly. Hayley is one of the top 1,500 female names in the US today.

Women with this given name
Notable people with the given name Hayley, or variant spellings of it, include:
 Hailey Abbott, American author
 Hayley Arceneaux (b. 1991), American physician assistant, bone cancer survivor and spaceflight participant
 Hailey Armstrong (b. 1996), Canadian curler
 Hayley Atwell (b. 1982), English actress
 Hailey Baptiste (b. 2001), American tennis player
 Hayley Barr  (b. 1971), American actress
 Mary Hayley Bell (1911–2005), English actress, writer, dramatist
 Hayley Beresford (b. 1978), Australian equestrian
 Hailey Bieber (b. 1996), American model, media personality, and socialite
 Hailey Clauson (b. 1995), American fashion model
 Hailey Colborn (b. 2000), American beauty pageant titleholder
 Hailey Cramer (b. 1987), Australian nu-soul singer
 Hailey Danz (b. 1991), American paratriathlete
 Hailey Dawson (b. 2010), American girl with 3D-printed robotic hand
 Hailie Deegan (b. 2001), American racing driver
 Hailey Duff (b. 1997), Scottish curler
 Haylie Duff (b. 1985), American actress and singer
 Hailey Duke (b. 1985), American skier
 Hayley Elsaesser, Canadian fashion designer
 Hali Flickinger (b. 1994), American swimmer
 Hailey Gates, American model, actress, director, and journalist
 Hailey Harbison (b. 1996), American soccer player
 Hailey Hatred (b. 1983), American wrestler
 Hailey Hernandez (b. 2003), American diver
 Hayley Angel Holt (b. 1983), English actress
 Hailey Kilgore (b. 1999), American actress and singer
 Hailey Kinsel (b. 1994), American barrel racer
 Hayley Kiyoko (b. 1991), American singer and actress
 Hailey Kops (b. 2002), Israeli pair skater
 Hailey Langland (b. 2000), American snowboarder
 Hayley Lewis (b. 1974), Australian swimmer
 Hali Long (b. 1995), American-Filipino footballer
 Halie Loren (b. 1984), American singer-songwriter
 Hailie Mace (b. 1997), American soccer player
 Hayley Mackey (born 2001), is a New Zealand judoka
 Hailey McCann (b. 1995), American actress
 Hayley Mills (b. 1946), English actress, daughter of Mary Hayley Bell
 Hayley Faith Negrin (b. 2003), American child voice actress
 Hayley Okines (1997–2015), English girl with rare aging disease
 Hayley Orrantia (b. 1994), American singer and actress
 Haylee Outteridge, Australian sailor
 Hailey Owens (2003–2014), American murder victim
 Haylee Partridge (b. 1981), New Zealand cricketer
 Hayley Peirsol (b. 1985), American swimmer
 Hayley Petit (1989–2007), American murder victim
 Sian Hayley Proctor (b. 1970), American geology professor, science communicator and spaceflight participant
 Hayley Raso (b. 1994), Australian footballer
 Haylee Roderick (b. 1990), American dancer, model, and actress
 Hailie Sahar (b. 1988), American actress
 Hayley Silver-Holmes  (b. 2003), Australian cricketer
 Hayley Sproull (b. 1989), New Zealand comedian
 Hailee Steinfeld (b. 1996) American actress
 Hailey Swirbul (b. 1998), American cross-country skier
 Hayley Tamaddon (b. 1977), English actress
 Halie Tiplady-Hurring (b. 1986), New Zealand rugby union player
 Hailey Tuck (b. 1990), American singer
 Hayley Tullett (b. 1973), Welsh runner
 Hailey Van Lith (b. 2001), American basketball player
 Hayley Westenra (b. 1987), New Zealand singer
 Hailey Whitters (b. 1989), American singer-songwriter
 Hayley Wickenheiser (1978), Canadian ice hockey player
 Hayley Williams (b. 1988), American lead singer-songwriter from Paramore
 Lee Ha-jin (b. 1988), nicknamed Haylee, Korean Go player

Fictional characters with this given name
 Hayley Cropper in the TV series Coronation Street
 Hailey Dean, titular character in the mystery series of the same name 
 Hayley Dunphy in the TV series Modern Family
 Hayley Ferguson in the episode "Freak the Freak Out" on the American teen sitcom Victorious
 Hayley Foster in Power Rangers Ninja Steel
 Hayley Kaplan in the game Android: Netrunner
 Hayley Long in the animated series American Dragon: Jake Long
 Hayley Marshall in the TV series The Originals
 Hailey Nichol in the TV series The O.C.
 Hailey Ruthledge in Mozart in the Jungle
 Hayley Smith in the TV series American Dad!
 Hayley Smith in the TV series Home and Away
 Hayley Stark in the film Hard Candy
 Hayley Steele in the TV series The Troop
 Hailey Upton in the TV series Chicago P.D.
 Hayley Vaughan Santos in the TV series All My Children
 Hayley Ziktor in Power Rangers Dino Thunder
 Hailey in the TV series The Other Kingdom
 Hayley the Rain Fairy, a character from the Rainbow Magic book franchise
 Hayley Haller in the TV series The Lincoln Lawyer
 Hailey, a character from Pit People

See also
 Haley (given name)
 Haley (surname)
 Halley (surname), similar but unrelated name which can have the same pronunciation
 Halley (given name)
 Hailey (disambiguation)
 Haile (disambiguation)
 Hailee,  given name
 Halie, various characters in Greek mythology

References

English feminine given names
English unisex given names
English-language unisex given names